Kigilyakh Peninsula is a peninsula in the New Siberian Islands, Sakha Republic, Russia.

History
This geographic feature was named after the Kigilyakh stone pillars. In Soviet times on the Kigilyakh Peninsula, Vladimir Voronin, then in charge of the Polar station on the island, was shown a large standing rock which had been heavily eroded and which gave name to the peninsula.

Geography
The Kigilyakh Peninsula is located in Bolshoy Lyakhovsky Island on the Laptev Sea. The peninsula is conspicuous from the air, projecting southwestwards from the western end with its isthmus in the east. Cape Vagin in the NW and Cape Kigilyakh in the SW shore of the peninsula are the westernmost points of Bolshoy Lyakhovsky. The Malakatyn River and the Gora Malakatyn-Chokur hill are some of the other geographic features of the peninsula.

There is a scientific research base near Cape Kigilyakh.

See also
Kigilyakh

References 

Peninsulas of Russia
Laptev Sea
Landforms of the Sakha Republic